Donald Farris Norton (March 3, 1938 – June 23, 1997) was an American Football League (AFL) end. He played college football at the University of Iowa and was drafted by the newly formed AFL in 1960, playing seven seasons for the Los Angeles/San Diego Chargers (1960–1966), making the AFL All-Star team in 1961 and 1962. After retiring, Norton began to experience health problems from steroid use, which was widespread in the teams he played on. He suffered a heart attack at the age of 59 and died in 1997 after undergoing open heart surgery.

See also
Other American Football League players

References

1938 births
1997 deaths
Sportspeople from Iowa City, Iowa
Players of American football from Iowa
American football wide receivers
Iowa Hawkeyes football players
Los Angeles Chargers players
San Diego Chargers players
American Football League All-Star players
People from Anamosa, Iowa
American Football League players